Mission Extreme is a Bangladeshi Police Action Thriller Film produced by COP Creation and Mime Multimedia. It is jointly directed by Sunny Sanwar and Faisal Ahmed. The film stars Arifin Shuvoo, Oishee, Sadia Nabila, Taskeen Rahman, Misha Sawdagor, Sumit Sengupta in lead roles.

The film is set to be the first in a two film series. Initially it was scheduled to release on the occasion of Eid al-Fitr in 2020, but was postponed due to the COVID-19 pandemic. It was released in theatres on 3 December 2021.

Cast
 Arifin Shuvoo as Nabid Al Shahriar, Additional Deputy Commissioner of Police (ADC), CTTC.
 Oishee as Sylvi
 Taskeen Rahman as Khalid
 Sadia Nabila as Era
Sumit Sengupta as Shohid
 Sudip Biswas Deep
 Raisul Islam Asad
 Fazlur Rahman Babu as Dibba Babu
 Iresh Zaker
 Shahiduzzaman Selim as Police Commissioner
 Shatabdi Wadud as DC Mahabub
 Manoj Kumar Pramanik as Rana
 Maznun Mizan as Salehin
 Misha Sawdagor as Khan
 Aref Syed as Jayesh
 Syed Hasan Imam (actor) as Home Minister
 Khalid Hasan Rumi

Production

Pre-production 
After the success of Dhaka Attack (2017) in December 2018, Sunny Sarwar had announced about the making of Mission Extreme. It was announced that Arifin Shuvoo would play as the protagonist of the film. In 2019, Taskeen Rahman, Jannatul Ferdous Oishee, Sadia Nabila and other actors and actress got attached to the film as well. It will be the debut film of Miss Bangladesh Jannatul Ferdous Oishee.

Filming 
The filming of the movie started from 20 March 2019. The filming of this film occurred in Dubai too.

Reception

Critical response 
On The review of The Daily star News it Praised The Movie as its one of few original films in dhallywood While tbs news criticize the movie saying it tries too hard and the story isnt any thrilling. NatunNews Moniter Claimed the movie to be really enjoyble,Saying Arefin shuvo,Jannatul Ferdous Oishee and Taskeen Rahman's performance were the best whlle also claming the VFX in the movie to be really poor.

Awards

References

External links

Bengali-language Bangladeshi films
Bangladeshi action films
Films postponed due to the COVID-19 pandemic
Films scored by Adit Ozbert